Float Away may refer to:

 Float Away, a 2005 album by Andrea Lewis
 Float Away, a 2006 song by Robbie Rivera
 Float Away, a song from the 2013 Donora album Play Nice